Yılmaz Yücetürk (died 20 May 2005 in Kadıköy, Istanbul) was a Turkish football coach who last managed the Eritrea national football team.

Career
Rising through Fenerbahce's youth ranks, Yücetürk played for MKE Ankaragücü and PTT, the previous incarnation of Türk Telekom GSK, during his senior career. One year succeeding his retirement, Yücetürk took over the family business and never thought about a return to football; however, after going to Germany to watch the 1974 World Cup, the former player entered the Cologne Sport University as a superannuated student and got a PhD in football. More than a decade later, Yücetürk was technical director of Fenerbahce. He also served as coach for Kuşadasıspor, Zeytinburnuspor, and Erzurumspor in his later career. The former midfielder also assumed the role of president of the Turkish Football Federation's Research and Planning Department upon returning to Turkey.

In the summer of 2000, Yücetürk took charge of the Eritrea national team upon request as part of a Meridian project for African football development, an idea incubated by FIFA. There, he trained over 100 coaches and organized 5 coaching symposiums. Besides heading the Eritrean men's team, he helped develop the Eritrea women's national football team as well with the Turkish Football Federation covering half his salary.

On May 20, 2005, Yücetürk died at the Acıbadem Kozyatağı Hospital in Istanbul.

Personal life
Yücetürk had a wife and two sons.

Bibliography

References

Turkish expatriate sportspeople in Eritrea
Turkish football managers
Turkish expatriate football managers
Association football midfielders
1940s births
2005 deaths
Turkish footballers
Expatriate football managers in Eritrea
People from Gönen